Victor Leksell (born 4 April 1997) is a Swedish singer from Torslanda. Since his first releases in 2018, his most successful single was released in 2020, called "Svag". The song peaked at number one on the Swedish Singles Chart and it was also certified nonuple platinum in the country. On 17 June 2020, Leksell released his debut studio album, Fånga mig när jag faller. It peaked at number 1 in Sweden and made it to number 3 in Norway.

Career 
Leksell participated in Idol 2017 where he made it to the Top 21 and qualifying week before being voted off. In 2018, he released the song "Tappat" which received over 5 million streams on Spotify. As of February 2020, the song has amassed over 25 million streams. His fifth single "Svag" peaked at number one on the Swedish Singles Chart, thus becoming Leksell's first single to reach that position. He released the song a few weeks after performing it at Musikhjälpen in 2019. The song held the number one spot for seven consecutive weeks, from week four to week eleven, being replaced by the Weeknds "Blinding Lights" in the latter week. However, "Svag" returned to number one on the chart in week 12 and stayed there for one week. On 3 May 2020, the song also placed at number one on Sveriges Radios chart Svensktoppen. The song was subsequently certified nonuple platinum in Sweden. It also peaked at number one on the Norwegian chart. He released his sixth single in March 2020, "Fantasi", which peaked at number seven on the Swedish Singles Chart.

On 10 April 2020, Leksell, Molly Sandén and Joakim Berg released a cover of Kents song "Sverige" and all of its revenue will go to Radiohjälpen's fundraising for the COVID-19 risk groups in Sweden. The song peaked at number 11 on the Swedish Singles Chart. Leksell subsequently performed at the SVT live-show En kväll tillsammans on 11 April 2020, in support of the fundraising. In May 2020, Leksell performed the song "Svag" together with Norwegian singer Astrid S at the border between Norway and Sweden.

On 17 June 2020, Leksell released his debut studio album, titled Fånga mig när jag faller. The album contains the previously released singles "Vart du sover", "Tappat", "Allt för mig", "Klär av dig", "Svag" and "Fantasi". The album debuted at number one on the Swedish Albums Chart.

Awards and nominations 
In the summer of 2019, Leksell was nominated in three categories at the Swedish magazine Aftonbladets competition "Rockbjörnen". Subsequently, he won his first "Rockbjörn" on 13 August 2019 in the category "Årets genombrott". Leksell was also nominated for "Årets nykomling" at the Swedish "Grammisgalan" in 2020.

Personal life 
Leksell grew up in Torslanda; as of March 2021, he lives in an apartment in Gothenburg with his girlfriend, Lisa.

Discography

Studio albums

Singles

Featured singles

Other charting songs

References

Living people
1997 births
Idol (Swedish TV series) participants
21st-century Swedish singers
Swedish pop singers
21st-century Swedish male singers